Czarnik is a surname. Notable people with the surname include:

 Anthony Czarnik, an American scientist and inventor
 Austin Czarnik (born 1992), American professional ice hockey player
 Marcin Czarnik (born 1976), Polish film and theatre actor
 Melissa Czarnik, emcee and poet based in Brooklyn, NY
 Tamarack Czarnik, a medical researcher focused on outer space

Polish-language surnames